Oxyphlaeobella is a genus of grasshoppers in the family Acrididae, subfamily Acridinae. Species can be found in southern China and Indo-China.

The head is narrow and pointed with the fastigium  slightly longer than wide. The head, pronotum, and rear of the abdomen are heavily wrinkled. It differs from Chlorophlaeoba in the shape of its forewings and fastigium.

The genus was formally described by German entomologist Willy Ramme in 1940.

Species
Species and type localities include:
Oxyphlaeobella kongtumensis Mishchenko & Storozhenko, 1990 — Vietnam
Oxyphlaeobella rugosa Ramme, 1941 — Chin Hills, Myanmar

References

Acridinae
Acrididae genera
Orthoptera of Indo-China